Tino Mohaupt (born 29 August 1983) is a German sports shooter. He competed at the 2008 and 2012 Summer Olympics.

References

External links
 

1983 births
Living people
German male sport shooters
Olympic shooters of Germany
Shooters at the 2008 Summer Olympics
Shooters at the 2012 Summer Olympics
People from Suhl
Sportspeople from Thuringia